Sinomicrurus is a genus of venomous elapid snakes, one of several genera commonly known as Asian coral snakes or oriental coral snakes. The genus includes 9 subtropical species found in Asia. Molecular and morphological analysis suggest this new genus is part of the family Elapidae.

Species and subspecies
Sinomicrurus annularis   – MacClelland’s coral snake (China)
Sinomicrurus boettgeri   – Boettger's coral snake (Japan)
Sinomicrurus iwasakii  – Iwasaki's temperate Asian coral snake (Ryukyu Islands)
Sinomicrurus japonicus  – Japanese coral snake (Ryukyu Islands)
Sinomicrurus japonicus japonicus 
Sinomicrurus japonicus takarai 
Sinomicrurus kelloggi  – Kellogg's coral snake (Vietnam, Laos, China)
Sinomicrurus macclellandi  – MacClelland's coral snake (India , Nepal, Myanmar, Thailand, Vietnam, China, Ryukyu Islands, Taiwan)
Sinomicrurus macclellandi macclellandi 
Sinomicrurus macclellandi univirgatus 
Sinomicrurus peinani  – Guangxi coral snake (China, Vietnam) 
Sinomicrurus sauteri  (Taiwan)
Sinomicrurus swinhoei  – Swinhoe's temperate Asian coral snake (Taiwan)

Nota bene: An authority (binomial or trinomial) in parentheses indicates that the taxon (species or subspecies) was originally described in a genus other than Sinomicrurus.

References

External links

 
Reptiles of Asia
Snake genera